Three ships of the German Kaiserliche Marine (Imperial Navy) have been named SMS Leipzig, after the Battle of Leipzig:

 , a 
 , a  that was sunk at the Battle of the Falkland Islands in 1914
 , a  that was cancelled before completion in 1918

See also
 , a  during World War II

German Navy ship names